Phyllonorycter kuznetzovi is a moth of the family Gracillariidae. It is known from the Russian Far East.

The larvae feed on Lespedeza bicolor. They probably mine the leaves of their host plant.

References

kuznetzovi
Moths of Asia
Moths described in 1982